Veronese is a crater on Mercury. Its name was adopted by the International Astronomical Union (IAU) on June 28, 2021. Veronese is named for the Italian painter Paolo Veronese.

Vereonese contains a large irregular depression in its floor.  The depression is bright and probably contains hollows.  Similar depressions are present within nearby Mistral crater.  The depressions are similar to those within Navoi, Lermontov, Scarlatti, and Praxiteles.  The depressions resemble those associated with volcanic explosions.

References

Impact craters on Mercury